Nikki Snel (born 13 August 1993) is a Belgian female acrobatic gymnast. With partner Eline de Smedt, Snel achieved gold in the 2014 Acrobatic Gymnastics World Championships.

References

External links

 

1993 births
Living people
Belgian acrobatic gymnasts
Female acrobatic gymnasts
Medalists at the Acrobatic Gymnastics World Championships